The Uruguay national beach soccer team represents Uruguay in international beach soccer competitions and is controlled by the AUF, the governing body for football in Uruguay.

Results and fixtures

The following is a list of match results in the last 12 months, as well as any future matches that have been scheduled.

Legend

2021

Players

Current squad
The following players and staff members were called up for the 2021 FIFA Beach Soccer World Cup.

Head coach: German Parrillo
Assistant coach: Leandro Ortiz

Competitive record

FIFA Beach Soccer World Cup

Coaching staff

Current coaching staff

Manager: Fernando Rosa
Technical Assistant: Pablo Sanguinetti
Head Delegation: Kevork Kouyoumdjian

Manager history

Fernando Rosa

Honours
FIFA Beach Soccer World Cup Best: Runners-up
2006
CONCACAF and CONMEBOL Beach Soccer Championship Best: Runners-up
2005, 2007
CONMEBOL Beach Soccer Championship Best: Runners-up
2006, 2009
Mundialito de Futebol de Praia Best: Third Place
1999
Copa Latina Best: Champions
2011

References

External links
Uruguay at BSWW
 Uruguay at Beach Soccer Russia

B
South American national beach soccer teams
Football in Uruguay